Exzellenz Unterrock (Her Excellency in Petticoats) is a 1920 German silent comedy film, based on the novel of the same title by Adolf Paul. Its cast included Marion Regler as the Chevalier d'Eon, Alexander Ekert as George II of Great Britain, Ellen Petz as Madame de Pompadour and Jürgen Fehling as Louis XV of France. It was one of a number of films produced in the Weimar Republic featuring women in "trouser roles".

References

External links

Exzellenz Unterrock at Filmportal.de, Deutsches Filminstitut 
Mention of film in Queer Cinema: Schoolgirls, Vampires, and Gay Cowboys
Mention of film in The Concise Cinegraph: Encyclopaedia of German Cinema
Mention of film in Before Caligari: German cinema, 1895-1920

1920 films
1920 comedy films
German comedy films
Films of the Weimar Republic
German silent feature films
Films set in the 18th century
Cross-dressing in film
Films based on German novels
Films based on Swedish novels
German black-and-white films
1921 comedy films
1921 films
Silent comedy films
1920s German films